The City of Imola motorcycle Grand Prix was a  round of the FIM Grand Prix motorcycle racing championship between 1996 and 1999.

History
The first City of Imola Grand Prix was held in 1996, its official name being in Italian (Città di Imola). It was the first time since the 1983 San Marino Grand Prix that a motorcycle grand prix race was held at Imola. The amount of spectators who visited the inaugural Grand Prix that year was lower than expected, averaging at only 30.000 people. This was low compared to the events held in the past on the same circuit. The race was nonetheless exciting when heavy rain suddenly hit the circuit at lap 18 of 25. This caused the red flag to be brought out and the race to be suspended. The results from lap 16 were counted and full points were rewarded because more than 75% of the race was ridden. The win went to the Australian Mick Doohan. The event in 1997 was visited even worse: only around 28.000 came to see all sessions combined. In 2000, the City of Imola Grand Prix was taken off the calendar - presumably because of declining spectator attendance.

Official names and sponsors 
1996: Gran Premio IP Città di Imola
1997: Gran Premio Città di Imola (no official sponsor)
1998: Gran Premio Cirio Città di Imola
1999: Gran Premio Breil Città di Imola

Winners of the Imola Grand Prix

Multiple winners (riders)

Multiple winners (manufacturers)

By year

References

Sources
50 Years Of Moto Grand Prix (1st edition). Hazelton Publishing Ltd, 1999. 

Motorsport competitions in Italy
Imola
Recurring sporting events established in 1996
Recurring sporting events disestablished in 1999
1996 establishments in Italy
1999 disestablishments in Italy